This is a list of Swedish television related events from 1958.

Events
12 March - Sweden enters the Eurovision Song Contest for the first time with "Lilla stjärna" performed by Alice Babs.

Debuts

Television shows

Ending this year

Births

Deaths

See also
1958 in Sweden